Shaw-cum-Donnington is a civil parish in West Berkshire, England with all of its urban or suburban area immediately north of the largest town in the district, Newbury.  It comprises the villages of Shaw and Donnington and contains the partially ruined castle of Donnington Castle which has most of its various outside walls intact. The area is mostly green space but where developed is almost entirely residential with shops and cafés.  It has housing immediately north of the town of Newbury.

Amenities
The ecclesiastical parish which crosses the River Lambourn bounding the civil parish to the south for a few hundred metres, is of the same name.  It has one church which has an active Church of England community at Shaw. and also has the area's Church of England primary school.

The Vodafone World Headquarters are in the south of the village.

Demography

References

External links 

 Berkshire History: Shaw-cum-Donnington Parish Church — St. Mary's Church

West Berkshire District
Civil parishes in Berkshire